Ancient Warriors is a 1994 20-part documentary series from the Discovery Channel.

Overview
Each 30 minute episode looks at a major fighting people or force and charts the reasons for their rise to dominance and subsequent fall. The show explores the motivations of ancient soldiers, as well as how they lived, fought, trained, died, and changed their world. It also uses re-enactments and computer graphics to demonstrate tactics and military strategy.

Episodes
The shows were aired as "three series" over a one-year period, from April 1994 to June 1995.

Home media
A DVD set of the three series was released in October 2002. Each Volume contains two discs.
 Volume I - Episodes 1–7
 Volume II - Episodes 8–14
 Volume III - Episodes 15–20

Details 
 Release Date: October 8, 2002
 Format: Color, NTSC
 Language: English
 Region: Region 1 (U.S. and Canada only.)
 Aspect Ratio: 1.33:1
 Number of discs: 2 (per Volume)
 Rated: Not Rated
 Run Time: 197 minutes (Volume 1, Volume 2)

References

External links
 Ancient Warriors at Docuwiki

Discovery Channel original programming
1990s American documentary television series
1994 American television series debuts
1995 American television series endings